The 14th Annual Japan Record Awards took place at the Imperial Garden Theater in Chiyoda, Tokyo, on December 31, 1972, starting at 7:00PM JST. The primary ceremonies were televised in Japan on TBS.

Award winners 
Japan Record Award
Naomi Chiaki for "Kassai"
 Lyricist: Ou Yoshida
 Composer: Taiji Nakamura
 Arranger: Hiroshi Takada
 Record Company: Nippon Columbia
Best Vocalist
Akiko Wada for "Ano Kane Wo Narasunowa Anata"
Best New Artist
Megumi Asaoka for "Mebae"

Vocalist Award
 Rumiko Koyanagi for "Seto No Hanayome"
 Last year's best new artist, the vocalist that has the most potential to receive the Japan Record Award. However, given to Chiaki as she sings the wrong lyric during the performance.
 Hiroshi Itsuki for "Yogisha No Onna"
 Awarded again after last year, 2nd vocalist award.
 Kenji Sawada for "Yurusarenai Ai"
New Artist Award
 Aoi Sankujyougi for "Taiyou Ga Kureta Kisetsu"
 Go Hiromi for "Otoko No Ko Onna No Ko"
 Eiji Miyoshi for "Ame"
 Masako Mori for "Sensei"
General Public Award
 Mari Amachi for "Mizuiro No Koi" & "Hitojyanai No"
 Yukio Hashi for "Kodzure Ookami"
Lyricist Award
 Kazuya Senke for "Shuuchaku Eki"
 Singer: Chiyo Okumura
Composer Award
 Shunichi Tokura for "Dounimo Tomaranai" and "Namida"
 Singer: Linda Yamamoto and Jun Inoue
Arranger Award
 Shiroo Tsuchimochi for "Hachi No Musashi Wa Shindanosa"
 Singer: Takao Hirata & Sellsters
Planning Award
 Dark Ducks & King Records for "Nihon Kasho Oyakka"
 Awarded again after 5 years, King Record's 3rd planning award.
Children's Song Award
 Suginami Junior Chorus & Zei Kanamori for "Pin Pon Pan Taisou"

Special Award
 Fubuki Koshiji 
Song: Dare Mo Inai Umi
 Miyuki Ishimoto
Songs: Onna No Kaikyou, Minatomachi Juusanbanchi, Nagasaki No Zazonburi

External links
Official Website

Japan Record Awards
Japan Record Awards
Japan Record Awards
Japan Record Awards
1972